James E. Edmondson (born March 7, 1945) is a justice of the Oklahoma Supreme Court. He was appointed to the Court's District 7 seat by Governor Brad Henry in 2003.

Early life
He graduated from Central High School in Muskogee, Oklahoma, before attending Northeastern State University. Following graduation from NSU in 1967, he served in the United States Navy for two years. He earned his J.D. degree from Georgetown University Law Center in 1973. From 1976 to 1978, he served as an Assistant District Attorney in Muskogee County, Oklahoma. From 1978 to 1981, he served in the U.S. Attorney's office in Muskogee, Oklahoma, as an Assistant United States Attorney, and later Acting United States Attorney. From 1981 to 1983, he was a Partner in the Edmondson Law Firm along with his brother, Drew Edmondson.

Judge
In 1983, he was appointed as a Judge for the 15th state Judicial District, based in Muskogee County, Oklahoma and served in that post until his appointment to the Oklahoma Supreme Court.

Governor Brad Henry appointed Edmondson as an associate justice of the Oklahoma Supreme Court in 2003, replacing the retiring Justice Hardy Summers. Edmondson was retained on the court in the 2006 election, and served as chief justice from 2009 to 2010. He was retained on the court again in the 2016 election.

Personal life
Edmondson was born in Kansas City, Missouri, and is the son of Ed Edmondson, a former U.S. Congressman from Oklahoma, and June Edmondson, a nephew of former U.S. Senator and Oklahoma Governor J. Howard Edmondson, and the brother of former Oklahoma Attorney General Drew Edmondson.

He is married to Suzanne Rumler Edmondson and has two children. His daughter Sarah Edmondson was given a 35-year prison sentence and served 12 years for her role in a crime spree, allegedly inspired by the movie Natural Born Killers, with her boyfriend which included a murder and robbery in Mississippi, and a robbery and attempted murder in Louisiana.  Sarah Edmondson was released on parole on May 20, 2010 and is serving her parole in Oklahoma which is set to end on June 1, 2025.

References

External links
 Official Supreme Court biography

1945 births
Living people
Assistant United States Attorneys
Edmondson family
Georgetown University Law Center alumni
Northeastern State University alumni
Justices of the Oklahoma Supreme Court
Lawyers from Kansas City, Missouri
Politicians from Kansas City, Missouri
Politicians from Muskogee, Oklahoma
Military personnel from Oklahoma
21st-century American judges